The TVG Free For All Pace is a harness racing event for Standardbred pacers run as a part of the four-race TVG FFA Championships at Meadowlands Racetrack in East Rutherford, New Jersey.

TVG Free For All Pace winners

References

Recurring sporting events established in 2013
Horse races in New Jersey
Harness racing in the United States
Sports in East Rutherford, New Jersey